Crocanthes venustula is a moth in the family Lecithoceridae. It was described by Turner in 1933. It is found in Australia, where it has been recorded from Queensland.

References

Moths described in 1933
Crocanthes